Javed Bhatti is a former cricketer who played first-class cricket for Bahawalpur in Pakistan from 1958 to 1975.

Probably born around 1940, Javed Bhatti had a long and successful career for Bahawalpur as a middle-order batsman and leg-spin bowler, often playing as captain. The highest of his eight centuries was 145 against Multan in 1971-72. His two best bowling performances came within a few days of each other in 1962-63. He took 5 for 29 and 5 for 59 and made 109 (the only score above 45 in the match) against Multan, then took 6 for 77 against Lahore B.

He scored a quick 105, the only century of the match, for The Rest against Pakistan in 1967-68, but he never played for Pakistan.

References

External links
 
 

Year of birth missing (living people)
Living people
Place of birth missing (living people)
Pakistani cricketers
Bahawalpur cricketers